Cassius Turvey was a 15-year-old Australian boy who was assaulted on 13 October 2022 in Perth, Western Australia, and died ten days later of his injuries. His death sparked vigils and rallies across Australia and internationally. Four people have been charged with his murder.

Background
Cassius Turvey was a 15-year-old Noongar-Yamatji boy. His given name was from Cassius Clay, the birth name of boxer Muhammad Ali, because his family wanted him to be named after a strong black man. He was concerned with negative stereotypes of Aboriginal people, and was well-liked in his community.

Death
On 13 October 2022, Turvey was attacked by an assailant armed with a metal pole,  while walking home from school with a group of friends in Middle Swan, a Perth suburb. The group, which included his best friend, was approached by a group of men in a utility vehicle who verbally harassed them. One of the men exited the vehicle and chased after the boys, catching Turvey and beating him with a metal pole. Turvey was taken to the hospital and treated for injuries. One of his friends, who was on crutches from a previous injury, was also attacked, with his crutches being stolen. He escaped with facial bruising.

Turvey was taken to St John of God Midland Hospital with lacerations on his head. A subsequent CT scan and MRI uncovered two brain bleeds, which resulted in him being transferred to Perth Children's Hospital, where he stayed for five days before being sent home. Several hours after being discharged he suffered a seizure and returned to hospital where he was placed in an induced coma. On 23 October, ten days after the attack, he died of his injuries.

Aftermath
Turvey's family said on 24 October that it could be a case of mistaken identity, and that he was targeted by the assailant thinking he was someone else.

His death sparked candlelit vigils and rallies across Australia on the evening of 2 November, as well as in New Zealand and Los Angeles. Turvey's mother, Mechelle Turvey, appealed for calm at the rallies, saying that she wanted no violence in her son's name, and that she was the only person who could get justice for her son. An ongoing vigil was set up at a tree near the site of the attack, dubbed "Cassius' tree".

A GoFundMe fundraising drive was created for Mechelle, whose husband  (and Cassius' father) had died one month before Cassius, due to cancer.  By 18 November, over  had been raised. Mechelle said that the funds would be used to set up a community service to help vulnerable and disadvantaged children.

Western Australian Police and premier Mark McGowan discouraged public speculation about the reasons for the attack. Australian prime minister Anthony Albanese described it as an attack that was "clearly racially motivated".

Human rights lawyer Hannah McGlade, a member of the UN Permanent Forum on Indigenous Issues, said that the death reminded the community of other deaths of Aboriginal teenagers, including Elijah Doughty and Thomas "TJ" Hickey.

His funeral was held on Friday 18 November 2022. Hundreds of people attended, and it was live-streamed across the country.

First Nations artists including Emma Donovan, Emily Wurramara, Drmngnow, Dobby and Optamus united to create a song in memory of Turvey, titled "Forever 15". It was played at his funeral and released three days later on 21 November 2022.

Legal proceedings
Police arrested and charged Jack Steven James Brearley, a 21-year-old man, with one count of unlawful wounding. After Turvey’s death police also charged him with murder. Brearley was also charged with unlawful assault causing bodily harm in circumstances of aggravation and stealing, after allegedly attacking Turvey's 13-year-old friend with a metal pole and stealing his walking crutches and cap. In January 2023, police also charged three more people with Turvey's murder: Aleesha Louise Gilmore, 20, Mitchell Colin Forth, 24 and Brodie Lee Palmer, 27.

References

October 2022 events in Australia

2020s in Perth, Western Australia
Deaths by person in Australia
Violent deaths in Australia
Noongar people
2022 deaths
Violence against Indigenous Australians